Robert Hughes (born June 21, 1989) is a former American football fullback. He played college football for University of Notre Dame, where he ran for 1,392 yards on 321 attempts, as well as catching 43 passes for 370 yards. He was signed by the Chicago Bears as undrafted free agent in 2011.

He was also a member of the Tampa Bay Buccaneers, Washington Redskins, Indianapolis Colts, and Arizona Cardinals.

Professional career

Chicago Bears
After not being drafted in the 2011 NFL Draft, Hughes signed with the Chicago Bears on July 27, 2011. Despite running for 69 yards and two touchdowns on 16 carries, as well as having two receptions for 26 yards in the preseason finale against the Cleveland Browns, Hughes was cut by the Bears for final cuts before the start of the 2011 season.

Tampa Bay Buccaneers
Hughes signed with the Tampa Bay Buccaneers on April 19, 2012. Robert recorded stats in 2 preseason games for the Bucs totaling 2 carries for 4 yards (2.0 yards average) and 2 receptions for 23 yards (11.5 yards average).  He was released by the team on August 31 during final roster cut downs before the start of the 2012 season narrowly missing making the team.

Washington Redskins
Hughes signed with the practice squad of the Washington Redskins on September 3, 2012. He was released on September 11, 2012.

Indianapolis Colts
Hughes was signed to the Indianapolis Colts practice squad on October 10, 2012.  Hughes was activated from the practice squad 10/29/2012.  Robert played in his first regular season NFL game November 4, 2012 against the Miami Dolphins and recorded his first statistic, a 3-yard reception from Andrew Luck in the first quarter of the Colts win over the Jacksonville Jaguars November 8th 2012.  He later recorded his first rushing attempt, with a five-yard rush, November 18, 2012 vs. the New England Patriots. He was released on May 1, 2013. On August 5, 2013, Hughes was re-signed by the Colts.

Arizona Cardinals
On December 23, 2013, Hughes signed with the Arizona Cardinals practice squad. On September 5, 2015, he was released by the Cardinals. On October 22, the Cardinals signed him to their practice squad. On January 26, 2016, Hughes signed a futures contract with the Arizona Cardinals. He was cut on April 15, 2016.

Cleveland Browns
Hughes was signed by the Browns. On August 29, 2016, Hughes was waived by the Browns.

References

External links
 Arizona Cardinals bio
 Notre Dame profile

1989 births
Living people
American football running backs
Arizona Cardinals players
Chicago Bears players
Indianapolis Colts players
Notre Dame Fighting Irish football players
Tampa Bay Buccaneers players
Washington Redskins players
Players of American football from Chicago
African-American players of American football
21st-century African-American sportspeople
20th-century African-American people